KHOT (1250 AM) is a radio station broadcasting a Catholic talk format. Licensed to Madera, California, United States, it serves the Madera-Fresno area. The station is owned by Relevant Radio, Inc.

External links

Relevant Radio stations
HOT